Draperstown railway station was on the Draperstown Railway which ran from Magherafelt to Draperstown in Northern Ireland, United Kingdom.

History 

The station was opened by the Draperstown Railway on 20 July 1883. It was taken over by the Northern Counties Committee in July 1895.

The station closed to passengers on 1 October 1930.

References 

Disused railway stations in County Londonderry
Railway stations opened in 1883
Railway stations closed in 1930
Railway stations in Northern Ireland opened in the 19th century